A firehouse primary, also called a firehouse caucus or "unassembled caucus", is a term sometimes used in the United States to describe a primary election run by a political party, not a government, to select the party's candidates for a later general election.  Firehouse primaries were originally held in public buildings such as firehouses. The term has been used principally for elections in the U.S. state of Virginia.

For the 2020 Democratic party primaries, Alaska, Hawaii, Kansas, and North Dakota conducted firehouse primaries. North Dakota used the term firehouse caucus for its event. Because firehouse primaries are held with more limited locations and time frames than state-run primaries, and party officials have more control over who the candidates are, firehouse primaries have been criticized as relatively undemocratic by some American commentators.

Firehouse primaries are the norm for the selection of candidates for public office in political parties outside of the United States and some parts of South America. The selection of candidates to compete for political officer on behalf of a political party in European nations is usually done by paying party members or party officials, or a mix of both, often without the use of any public infrastructure or direct funding. It is unusual for there to be any particularly strict or explicit legislation governing how parties can select their candidates. As such, a term like 'party selection', 'party election' or another local term is more likely to be used than 'firehouse primary'. Most countries do not have a system for voters to publicly register as identifying with a particular political party as in the United States which makes open primaries more difficult, though not impossible, to hold.

References 

Politics of Virginia
Caucuses in the United States
Primary elections in the United States
Politics of North Dakota